Kavita Bala was born in Mumbai (formerly known as Bombay), India in 1971 and is a computer scientist, entrepreneur, and academic. She is Professor in the Department of Computer Science at Cornell University. After serving as department chair from 2018–2020, she was appointed Dean of the Faculty for Computing and Information Science, now known as the Ann S. Bowers College of Computing and Information Science.

Bala’s research expertise is in computer vision and graphics. Her work was recognized in 2020 by the international Association for Computing Machinery's Special Interest Group on Computer Graphics and Interactive Technique - ACM SIGGRAPH - for “fundamental contributions to physically-based and scalable rendering, material modeling, perception for graphics, and visual recognition.” Her early research focused on realistic, physically-based rendering and includes seminal work on scalable rendering, notably the development of Lightcuts and other approximate illumination algorithms, as well as contributions to volumetric and procedural modeling of textiles. Currently, Bala is studying recognition of materials, styles, and other object attributes in images.

Her work on 3D Mandalas was featured at the Rubin Museum of Art, New York.

Education 
Bala received a Bachelor of Technology (B.Tech.) from the Indian Institute of Technology (IIT, Bombay) in 1992, and a Masters of Science (S.M.) and a Doctor of Philosophy (Ph.D.) in Computer Science from the Massachusetts Institute of Technology in 1999.

Career 
At Cornell University, Bala became a postdoctoral researcher in the program of computer graphics led by Donald P. Greenberg in 1999, and joined the Cornell Computer Science faculty in 2002.

Bala co-founded GrokStyle with Sean Bell, currently a research scientist at Facebook. GrokStyle, a visual recognition AI company, began as a vision search and shopping tool integrated with IKEA’s Augmented Reality application, and was subsequently acquired by Facebook in 2019. Facebook’s GrokNet - which allows users to buy, sell and discover items seamlessly across all of its Facebook platforms, builds on the fundamental technology originally developed at GrokStyle. 

Bala is on the Board of Directors of ColorStack, Board of Trustees of Toyota Technological Institute at Chicago (TTIC), the Advisory Board for ACM Transactions on Graphics, and the Papers Advisory Group for SIGGRAPH.

Bala served the research community in numerous important roles including Technical Papers Chair of SIGGRAPH Asia 2011, and Editor-in-Chief of ACM Transactions on Graphics from 2015 to 2018.

Research 
Bala’s early research focused on realistic, physically-based rendering and scalable rendering, notably the development of Lightcuts and other approximate illumination algorithms. The Lightcuts algorithm became the core production engine in Autodesk’s cloud renderer. She co-authored the book Advanced Global Illumination, which has become a classic text in the field. She has also contributed to volumetric and procedural modeling of textiles, and her work has also been influential on the role of perception in graphics.

A second thread in Bala’s work involves recognition of materials, styles, and other object attributes in images. Her work on intrinsic images and material recognition using crowd-sourced training data has been influential, her work on style transfer has also received recognition, and she also did pioneering work on style recognition. This technology powered GrokStyle, a successful visual search startup that Bala co-founded with Sean Bell.

Bala has also done notable recent work on worldwide analysis of fashion by analyzing image collections to uncover how cultural clothing trends vary around the world.

Recognition
Bala was elected as an ACM Fellow in 2019 “for contributions to rendering and scene understanding”. She was inducted into the SIGGRAPH Academy in 2020. She is the recipient of the SIGGRAPH Computer Graphics Achievement Award (2020), and the IIT Bombay Distinguished Alumnus Award in 2021.

References

Cornell University faculty
MIT School of Engineering alumni
1971 births
Living people
Computer graphics researchers
Indian women computer scientists
Indian women company founders
Indian expatriate academics
Indian expatriates in the United States
Fellows of the Association for Computing Machinery